Vidushi R. Vedavalli (born 9th November 1935) is a Carnatic vocalist.

Early life
R. Vedavalli was born in Mannargudi, Tamil Nadu, India to Ramaswami Iyengar and Padmasani Ammal.

Career
R. Vedavalli's talent for music was identified early on by Madurai Srirangam Iyengar, who brought the five-year-old a harmonium, and got her started on vocal lessons. The family moved to Madras in a few years time, and Vedavalli came under the tutelage of Mudicondan Venkatarama Iyer. 

She received a Central Government scholarship to specialize in Padams and Javalis with T.Muktha, and in Pallavis with Venkataramana Iyer. Though she has performed since childhood, it was Ariyakudi Ramanuja Iyengar who advised her to turn into a professional musician, when he heard her sing as an 18-year-old. She has travelled throughout India and abroad in North America, South-East Asia, the Far East and the Persian Gulf region, giving concerts and lecture demonstrations.

Vedavalli served in the Teacher's College of Music of the Madras Music Academy for several years before becoming Professor of Vocal Music in the Government College of Music Adyar. She has thus shared her deep knowledge and extensive repertoire with numerous students at these institutions apart from training some privately. 

She is also trained in playing the veena, and has a good command over Tamil, Sanskrit, Kannada, Telugu, which helps her sing with greater understanding or artha bhava (meaning and emotion). She lived in Chennai with her husband D. R. Santhanam and mother Padmasani Ammal, at the turn of the century. Later she and her husband moved to Pune to be with their daughter, and D R Santhanam died in Pune in July 2021.

Awards and recognitions

From a very young age, Vedavalli won several awards in prestigious competitions including All India Radio's first prize for Classical Music and Light Classical Music, awarded by the President of India. In 2000, she received the Sangeetha Kalanidhi, which is considered the highest award in Carnatic music. She is one of the few women to have received this honor. She also received the Sangeetha Kalasikhamani award given by the Fine Arts Society, Chennai in 1995.

Disciples

Among her disciples today are accomplished performers, researchers, teachers and writers. Sumitra Vasudev and her daughter Sushruti Santhanam are her disciples. Sushruti is based in Pune and teaches music there.

References

External links

 
 Her article on her childhood

Tamil singers
Women Carnatic singers
Carnatic singers
Indian music educators
Sangeetha Kalanidhi recipients
1935 births
Living people
Indian women classical singers
People from Tiruvarur district
20th-century Indian singers
20th-century Indian women singers
Singers from Tamil Nadu
Women musicians from Tamil Nadu
Women music educators
Recipients of the Sangeet Natak Akademi Fellowship
Recipients of the Sangeet Natak Akademi Award